Freedom of the press in India is legally protected by the Amendment to the constitution of India, while the sovereignty, national integrity, and moral principles are generally protected by the law of India to maintain a hybrid legal system for independent journalism. In India, media bias or misleading information is restricted under the certain constitutional amendments as described by the country's constitution. The media crime is covered by the Indian Penal Code (IPC) which is applicable to all substantive aspects of criminal law.

Nevertheless, freedom of the press in India is subject to certain restrictions, such as defamation law, a lack of protection for whistleblowers, barriers to information access and constraints caused by public and government hostility to journalists. The press, including print, television, radio, and internet are nominally amended to express their concerns under the selected provisions such as Article-19 (which became effective from 1950), though it states freedom of "occupation, trade or business" and "freedom of speech and expression" without naming "press" in clause "a" and "g". The article allows a journalist or media industries to cover any story and bring it to the audiences without impacting the national security of the country.

To protect the intellectual, moral, and fundamental rights of the citizens, the government has taken several countermeasures to combat circulating fake news and restricting objectionable contents across the multiple platforms. The law of India prohibits spreading or publishing fake news through social or mass media, and could lead to imprisonment of a journalist or newspaper ban.

Global ranking 
In 2020, India's press freedom rank dropped to 142 out of 180 countries in Press Freedom Index, an annual ranking of countries published by Reporters Without Borders (RWB), an international non-governmental organization dedicated to safeguard the right to freedom of information. In 2019, the country's press freedom was recorded 140 rank in Press Freedom Index, making it a slight decline than in previous annual report. The India's global index rank was declined for several issues such as killings of journalists, restrictions imposed on news media, censorship in Kashmir, and Jammu and Kashmir which has been a subject of dispute between India and Pakistan.

Targeting victims such as physical abuse against journalists and prejudice is one of the other reasons for the decline in the world ranking index. In 2017, the country was ranked 136 out of 180 nations, and later it declined to 138 in 2018 in the world index report.

The 2022 edition of the World Press Freedom Index, which assesses the state of journalism in 180 countries and territories, reveals that India's ranking fell from 133 in 2016 to 150 in 2021. Reporters Without Borders (RSF) released the Index on 3 May 2022.

Reactions 
The Ministry of Information and Broadcasting criticised the report published by the Reporters Without Borders in 2020 citing "the surveys portray a bad picture about freedom of press in India".

Censorship on press 

In 2020, the Press Council of India, a state-owned body argued that government authorities, including state police's censorship on mass media is unfavorable citing "intimidation" of journalists and the "curtailment" of press freedom. The country's news outlets and their associated journalists were allegedly charged with sedition and criminal prosecution charges by the authorities. The Press Club of India (PCI) described charges against journalists as a "string of seemingly malafide actions". The organization claims that the federal government of India was responsible for unfavorable censorship of press and journalists. The International Press Institute (IPI), an international organizations dedicated to the improvement of journalistic practices, claims that the government of India is responsible for restricting journalists covering COVID-19 pandemic-related reports in the country.

In 2020, the Ministry of Information and Broadcasting blocked the MediaOne TV temporarily for covering a news about the "mob attacks on Muslims" in the country's capital New Delhi. The channel was later resumed after a period of 48 hours. The Jammu and Kashmir Police, a law enforcement and counterinsurgency agency, often interrogate journalists while some are charged and arrested over national security reportage and nominally defamatory news stories involving government. The state administration of Jammu and Kashmir also indefinitely stopped giving government ads to newspapers, including Greater Kashmir and Kashmir Reader running in the Jammu Jammu and Kashmir union territory, while the federal government banned Times of India, The Hindu and Telegraph India temporarily from running government ads on their platforms.

Sometimes, only news that favours the government is published by the local media, whilst news that covers the economic and political problems in the country, or criticisms of the government faces government-issued warnings. It is claimed that the print and broadcasting media carry stories on the bases of emotions or under the political pressure of the party in power, while the domestic media outlets are claimed to support leaders' arguments. Indian media is often criticized for carrying media war during military conflicts, and expressing one-sided identification with vigorous support for their interests. Several media outlets act as cheerleaders by publishing the political agenda of the ruling party's leaders. The constitution of India protects freedom of speech and freedom of the press. However, critics state that press freedom is restrained, and the government only encourages speech that supports it and the prevailing ruling party. The government is accused by critics of falsely labelling independent press with "fake news" to try to evade critical observation of the media.

In 2020 or earlier, the government of India issued warnings against the foreign news outlets, including The New York Times, The Guardian, Al Jazeera, The Washington Post, Time, The Economist, BBC, and Huffington Post for portraying India's image negatively.

Reporters Without Borders stated that followers of Hindutva are attempting to censor claimed "anti-national" thoughts. Coordinated hate campaigns by Hindutva followers against journalists critical of Hindutva sometimes call for those journalists to be murdered. Journalists critical of the government often suffer from criminal prosecutions, with Section 124A of the Indian Penal Code often being cited by prosecutors.

Attacks on journalists 
Several journalists such as Sagarika Ghose, Ravish Kumar have said that they were subjected to harassment, intimidation including death and rape threats when they were skeptical of the Bharatiya Janata Party government. Bobby Ghosh, the editor of the Hindustan Times resigned in September 2018 shortly after the Prime Minister Narendra Modi reportedly met Shobhana Bhartia, the owner of the newspaper. The incident occurred after Ghosh opened a portal called the Hate Tracker on the newspaper, a database for tracking violent crimes motivated by race, religion and sexual orientation. The database was later taken down.

At least three journalists were killed in 2017 in connection with their jobs. Reporters Without Borders stated Gauri Lankesh a proponent of secularism and a critic of right-wing forces was shot dead outside her house. A member of a Hindu nationalist group was arrested for killing Lankesh. A report stated that between 2014 and 2019, 40 journalists were killed and at least 198 severe attacks on journalists were reported, of which, 36 occurred in 2019 alone.

Reports Without Borders stated that journalists suffer from violence from the police, political activists, criminal groups, and corrupt local officials.

Cult of personality 
The media have consistently upheld the personality cult of the leaders since the country's formation. It reported on the activities of the leader, regularly reporting on their political campaigns, frequently including "advertisements" to ruling parties through radio, television and Newspaper display ads. Previously, media would refer to 2014 Indian general election campaign of the Bharatiya Janata Party, a major political party as the "Abki Baar, Modi Sarkar" (this time Modi government). The political slogan was heavily covered by news media in the country. Media reports in India that support the ruling party are criticized as being often one-sided and exaggerated, playing little or no role in gathering true information and providing propaganda on their platforms. The independent newspapers running in the country covered 2019 general election with a focus on Narendra Modi, inadvertently giving him more coverage.

The CMS Media Lab, a nonpartisanism subsidiary of the research organisation CMS stated in its report that Modi, the current prime minister, received 33.21% of the primetime news coverage during his last election campaign while the competitors' political parties such as Aam Aadmi Party led by Arvind Kejriwal received 10.31% media coverage and the Indian National Congress candidate Rahul Gandhi received 4.33% prime-time news telecast coverage.

See also 
Freedom of the press in British India
Editors Guild of India

References

Notes

Law of India
Freedom of information in India
Censorship in India
India